Budhwa Mangal or Bada Mangal is a series of festivals celebrated on every Tuesday in the Hindu month of Jeyshtha (May-June). 
According to the beliefs of Hinduism, Shri Hanuman met Shri Ram for the first time on Tuesday of the month of Jyestha. Since then it is believed that all Tuesdays of this month are auspicious. On this special day, there are kirtans in the temples and Bhandara (community kitchen) are organized for the devotees at various temples and places.

Hindu festivals